Bendix Helicopters, Inc. was the last company founded by prolific inventor Vincent Bendix, in 1943 in Connecticut.  It ceased operations in 1949.

History
It built a 10,000 square foot factory for helicopter production on East Main Street in Stratford, Connecticut in 1945. 

Bendix created 3 prototypes that used a system of coaxial rotors: Model K (1945), Model L and Model J (1946). 

Due to lack of sales and capital, in January 1947 the large factory building was sold to Manning, Maxwell and Moore, who were taken over by Dresser Industries in 1964. 

In 1949, Bendix Helicopter was forced to close. In an auction the assets of the company were sold to the Gyrodyne Company of America on Long Island in New York.  Gyrodyne continued development of several helicopter models introduced by Bendix.

See also
 Bendix Trophy

References

External links
 Helis.com: History of Bendix Helicopters

Defunct helicopter manufacturers of the United States
Companies based in Stratford, Connecticut
American companies established in 1943
Manufacturing companies established in 1943
Manufacturing companies disestablished in 1949
1943 establishments in Connecticut
1949 disestablishments in Connecticut
Defunct manufacturing companies based in Connecticut
Honeywell
Bendix Corporation